The House of Mikes de Zabola is a Hungarian noble family of Székely origin from the 16th century.

Notable members
Mihály Mikes (politician) (d. 1662), Chancellor of Transylvania (1656–1660)
Mihály Mikes (soldier) (d. 1721), created Baron (1693) then Count (1696), became kuruc after 1703
Kelemen Mikes (1820–1849), Honvéd general in the Hungarian Revolution of 1848, killed in the Siege of Nagyszeben (Sibiu)
Ármin Mikes 
János Mikes (1876–1945), Bishop of Szombathely (1911–1936)

From the Zágon branch
Kelemen Mikes (1690–1761), essayist, scribe of Francis II Rákóczi, died in exile

Manor Houses 
Bodola

Nagydebrek

Marosujvár

Szászfenes

Sepsibükszad

Uzon

Zágon

See also
List of titled noble families in the Kingdom of Hungary

External links 
 
 Mikes Castle webpage (English, German, Hungarian languages)
 Family history
 Adventures of a Hungarian Aristocrat in Greater Romania